General Sir Henry David Jones  DCL (14 March 1791 – 4 August 1866) was a British Army officer who became Governor of the Royal Military College, Sandhurst.

Life
He was the fifth son of John Jones by his wife, Mary, daughter of John Roberts, Esq., of Landguard Fort, an officer 29th Foot, and was brother of Major-General Sir John Thomas Jones, Bart., KCB, and uncle of Sir Willoughby Jones, Bart., of Cranmer Hall, Fakenham, Norfolk.

Educated at the Royal Military Academy, Woolwich, Jones was commissioned into the Royal Engineers in September 1808. In 1809 he was involved in the attack on the fortress at Flushing during the Walcheren Campaign. He then took part in the defence of Cadiz in 1809, the Siege of Badajoz in 1812, the Battle of Vitoria in 1813 and the Battle of Nivelle in 1813. He was wounded while leading the forlorn hope during the first assault at the Siege of San Sebastián in September 1813.

In February, 1815, he joined the army under General John Lambert on Dauphin Island, Alabama and was sent to New Orleans on special duty under a return American flag of truce.

On his return to Europe he joined the army in the Netherlands, landing at Ostend on 18June 1815. He was appointed commanding engineer in charge of the fortifications on Montmartre, after the entrance or the British troops into Paris under the Duke of Wellington. Jones was made a commissioner to the Prussian Army of Occupation in 1816 and went on special service to Constantinople in 1833.

He was appointed Commissioner of Municipal Boundaries in England in 1835, chairman of the board of public works in Ireland in 1845 and director of the Royal Engineer Establishment for Field Instruction at Chatham in 1851.

He served in the Crimean War commanding the British forces at the Battle of Bomarsund and then commanding the Royal Engineer forces at the Siege of Sevastopol. Afterwards he received the Order of the Medjidie, 2nd Class, the Baltic Medal and the Crimea Medal with clasp.

In 1856 he became Governor of the Royal Military College, Sandhurst. He was created an honorary Doctor of Civil Law (DCL) of the University of Oxford, and was honorary Colonel of the 4th Administrative Battalion, Cheshire Rifle Volunteer Corps. In 1859, he was appointed to serve on the Royal Commission on the Defence of the United Kingdom, whose recommendations prompted a huge programme of fortification for the British naval dockyards.

He died after "an illness of some duration" on 4August 1866 and is buried in the cemetery at the Royal Military Academy Sandhurst.

Cricket career
Jones was associated with Middlesex and was recorded in one first-class match in 1826, totalling 7 runs with a highest score of 6 and holding one catch.

Family
In 1824 Jones married Charlotte, daughter of the Reverend Thomas Hornsby, Vicar of Ravensthorpe, Peterborough and Rector of Hoddesdon, by whom he had six sons and five daughters. His eldest son, Harry Valette Jones, died in 1863; his second son, Captain Arthur Jones, 2nd West India Regiment, died on the coast of Africa in 1861; and his fourth son, Montagu Hornsby Jones, Esq., an ensign of the 84th Regiment of Foot, died in 1859.

Legacy
The Memorials to Governors in the Chapel of the Royal Military Academy, Sandhurst includes:
In Memory of Lieut.-General Sir Harry D. Jones, G.C.B., Royal Engineers, who died as Governor of these Royal Military Colleges on the 22nd August 1866. This Tablet was erected by his brother officers in admiration of his character and distinguished services.

References

 

1791 births
1866 deaths
British Army generals
Governors of the Royal Military College, Sandhurst
Knights Grand Cross of the Order of the Bath
Royal Engineers officers
People from Felixstowe
British Army personnel of the Crimean War
British Army personnel of the Napoleonic Wars
English cricketers
English cricketers of 1826 to 1863
Middlesex cricketers